Tocsin is the second studio album by German post-punk band Xmal Deutschland. It was released in June 1984 on 4AD.

Critical reception

AllMusic awarded Tocsin four-and-a-half stars out of five, praising the album as "a creative high point, a teutonic marriage of Siouxsie and the Banshees' inviting goth-pop and the majestic sonic spaces of the Cocteau Twins."

Track listing

Personnel
Musicians
 Vocals: Anja Huwe
 Guitars: Manuela Rickers
 Keyboards: Fiona Sangster
 Bass: Wolfgang Ellerbrock
 Drums: Petter Bellendir (tracks 1-9); Manuela Zwingman (tracks 10 and 11)

Production
 Produced by Mick Glossop (tracks 1-9); Ivo Watts-Russell and John Fryer (tracks 10 and 11)
 Engineered by Mick Glossop; assisted by Felix Kendall
 Design by 23 Envelope

References

Xmal Deutschland albums
1984 albums
4AD albums